Positive behavior support (PBS) uses tools from applied behaviour analysis and values of normalisation and social role valorisation theory to improve quality of life, usually in schools. PBS uses functional analysis to understand what maintains an individual's challenging behavior and how to support the individual to get these needs met in more appropriate way, instead of using 'challenging behaviours'. People's inappropriate behaviors are difficult to change because they are functional; they serve a purpose for them. These behaviors may be supported by reinforcement in the environment. People may inadvertently reinforce undesired behaviors by providing objects and/or attention because of the behavior. 

The positive behavior support process involves identifying goals, then undertaking functional behavior assessment (FBA). FBAs clearly describe behaviors, identify the contexts (events, times, and situation) that predict when behavior will and will not occur, and consequences that maintain the behavior. The FBA includes a hypothesis about the behavior and data for a baseline. This informs the support plan design, implementation and monitoring of the plan.

Positive behavior support is increasingly being recognized as a strategy that is feasible, desirable, and effective. For example, teachers and parents need strategies they are able and willing to use and that affect the child's ability to participate in community and school activities. 

By changing stimulus and reinforcement in the environment and teaching the person to strengthen deficit skill areas, their behavior changes. In schools, this can allow students to be included in the general education setting. 

Three areas of deficit skills addressed by PBS are communication skills, social skills, and self-management skills. Re-directive therapy as positive behavior support is especially effective in the parent–child relationship. Where other treatment plans have failed, re-directive therapy allows for a positive interaction between parents and children. Positive behavior support is successful in the school setting because it is primarily a teaching method.

In U.S. schools
Schools are required to conduct functional behavioral assessment (FBA) and use positive behavior support with students who are identified as disabled and are at risk for expulsion, alternative school placement, or more than 10 days of suspension. Even though FBA is required under limited circumstances it is good professional practice to use a problem-solving approach to managing problem behaviors in the school setting.

The use of Positive Behavior Interventions and Supports (PBIS) in schools is widespread in part because it is a professional skill in early special education programs (as opposed to Rogerian counseling). The program offers a primary, secondary, and tertiary level of intervention. A basic tenet of the PBIS approach includes identifying students in one of three categories - primary, secondary, or tertiary Interventions are specifically developed for each of these levels with the goal of reducing the risk for academic or social failure. The interventions become more focused and complex at each level.

Primary prevention strategies focus on interventions used on a school-wide basis for all students. PBS use for other than a designated population group has neither been approved by the professions or the public-at-large. This level of prevention is considered "primary" because all students are exposed in the same way, and at the same level, to the intervention. Approximately 80–85% of students who are not at risk for behavior problems respond in a positive manner to this prevention level. Primary prevention strategies include, but are not limited to, using effective teaching practices and curricula, explicitly teaching behavior that is acceptable within the school environment, focusing on ecological arrangement and systems within the school, consistent use of precorrection procedures, using active supervision of common areas, and creating reinforcement systems that are used on a school-wide basis.

Secondary prevention strategies involve around 10–15% of the school population who do not respond to the primary prevention strategies and are at risk for academic failure or behavior problems but are not in need of individual support. Interventions at the secondary level often are delivered in small groups to maximize time and effort and should be developed with the unique needs of the students within the group. Examples of these interventions include social support such as social skills training (e.g., explicit instruction in skill-deficit areas, friendship clubs, check in/check out, role playing) or academic support. Additionally, secondary programs could include behavioral support approaches (e.g., simple Functional Behavioral Assessments [FBA], precorrection, self-management training). 

Even with the heightened support within secondary level interventions, some students (1–7%) will need the additional assistance at the tertiary level.Tertiary prevention programs focus on students who display persistent patterns of disciplinary problems. Tertiary-level programs are also called intensive or individualized interventions and are the most comprehensive and complex. The interventions within this level are strength-based in that the complexity and intensity of the intervention plans directly reflect the complexity and intensity of the behaviors. Students within the tertiary level continue involvement in primary and secondary intervention programs and receive additional support as well. These supports could include use of full FBA, de-escalation training for the student, heightened use of natural supports (e.g., family members, friends of the student), and development of a Behavior Intervention Plan (BIP).

Although comprehensive services are important for all students, a critical aspect of the three-tiered model is the identification of students at one of the three levels. One method of identifying students in need of interventions is to analyze office disciplinary referrals (ODR) taken at the school. ODRs may be a means of both identifying students' risk level for antisocial behavior and school failure. Researchers have advocated analyzing this naturally occurring data source as a relatively cheap, effective, and ongoing measurement device for PBS programs.

ODRs have also been shown to be effective in determining where students fall within a three-leveled model, developing professional development as well as helping coordinate school efforts with other community agencies, predicting school failure in older grades as well as delinquency, indicating types of behavior resulting in referrals, and determination of the effectiveness of precorrection techniques. Analyzing discipline referral data can also help school personnel identify where to improve ecological arrangements within a school and to recognize how to increase active supervision in common areas. A limitation of only using ODRs to measure behavior problems is that they have been found to be ineffective at measuring internalizing behavior problems such as anxiety, depression, and withdrawal.

Functional behavior assessment
Functional Behavior Assessment (FBA) emerged from applied behavior analysis. It is the cornerstone of a Positive Behavior Support plan. The assessment seeks to describe the behavior and environmental factors and setting events that predict the behavior in order to guide the development of effective support plans. Assessment lays the foundation of PBS. The assessment includes:
 a description of the problem behavior and its general setting of occurrence
 identification of events, times and situations that predict problem behavior
 identification of consequences that maintain behavior
 identification of the motivating function of behavior
 collection of direct observational data
 identification of alternative behavior that could replace the person's problem behavior (i.e., what a typical child or adult does). Often this is measured through direct observation or standardized behavioral assessment instruments.

The results of the assessment help in developing the individualized behavior support plan. This outlines procedures for teaching alternatives to the behavior problems, and redesign of the environment to make the problem behavior irrelevant, inefficient, and ineffective.

Behavior chain analysis is another avenue of functional behavior assessment, which is growing in popularity. In behavior chain analysis, one looks at the progressive changes of behavior as they lead to problem behavior and then attempts to disrupt this sequence. Whereas FBA is concerned mostly with setting-antecedent-behavior-consequence relations, the behavior chain analysis looks at the progression of behavior. For example, a child may fidget at first, then begin to tease others, then start to throw things, and finally hit another student.

Behavioral strategies available
There are many different behavioral strategies that PBS can use to encourage individuals to change their behavior. Some of these strategies are delivered through the consultation process to teachers. The strong part of functional behavior assessment is that it allows interventions to directly address the function (purpose) of a problem behavior. For example, a child who acts out for attention could receive attention for alternative behavior (contingency management) or the teacher could make an effort to increase the amount of attention throughout the day (satiation). Changes in setting events or antecedents are often preferred by PBS because contingency management often takes more effort. Another tactic especially when dealing with disruptive behavior is to use information from a behavior chain analysis to disrupt the behavioral problem early in the sequence to prevent disruption. Some of the most commonly used approaches are:
 Modifying the environment or routine, using the three term contingency, particularly antecedents (such as curriculum), behavior, and/or consequences
 Providing an alternative to the undesired behavior (not the same as a reward; it should be an alternative that is readily available to the person. The thought behind this is that the person may, over time, learn to more independently seek out appropriate options rather than the undesired behavior(s)).
 Tactical ignoring of the behavior (also called extinction)
 Distracting the child
 Positive reinforcement for an appropriate behavior
 Changing expectations and demands placed upon the child
 Teaching the child new skills and behaviors
 Graded extinction and cognitive behavioral therapies (CBTs) such as desensitization
 Provide sensory based breaks to promote an optimal level of arousal and calming for increased use the replacement/alternative behavior
 Changing how people around the child react
 Time-out (child)
 Medication

Behavior management program
The main keys to developing a behavior management program include:
 Identifying the specific behaviors to address
 Establishing the goal for change and the steps required to achieve it
 Procedures for recognizing and monitoring changed behavior
 Choosing the appropriate behavioral strategies that will be most effective.

Through the use of effective behavior management at a school-wide level, PBS programs offer an effective method to reduce school crime and violence. To prevent the most severe forms of problem behaviors, normal social behavior in these programs should be actively taught.

Consequential management/contingency management
Consequential management is a positive response to challenging behavior. It serves to give the person informed choice and an opportunity to learn. Consequences must be clearly related to the challenging behavior. For example, if a glass of water was thrown and the glass smashed, the consequence (restitution) would be for the person to clean up the mess and replace the glass. These sorts of consequences are consistent with normal social reinforcement contingencies.

Providing choices is very important and staff can set limits by giving alternatives that are related to a behavior they are seeking. It is important that the alternative is stated in a positive way and that words are used which convey that the person has a choice. For example:
 Coercive approach – "If you don't cut that out you'll have to leave the room."
 Positive approach – "You can watch TV quietly or leave the room."

Implementation on a school-wide level
School-Wide Positive Behavior Support (SW-PBS) consists of a broad range of systematic and individualized strategies for achieving important social and learning outcomes while preventing problem behavior with all students.

A measurable goal for a school may be to reduce the level of violence, but a main goal might be to create a healthy, respectful, and safe learning, and teaching, environment. PBS on a school-wide level is a system that can be used to create the "perfect" school, or at the very least a better school, particularly because before implementation it is necessary to develop a vision for what the school environment should look like in the future.

According to Horner et al. (2004), once a school decides to implement PBS, the following characteristics require addressing:

 define 3 to 5 school-wide expectations for appropriate behavior;
 actively teach the school-wide behavioral expectations to all students; 
 monitor and acknowledge students for engaging in behavioral expectations;
 correct problem behaviors using a consistently administered continuum of behavioral consequences
 gather and use information about student behavior to evaluate and guide decision making;
 obtain leadership of school-wide practices from an administrator committed to providing adequate support and resources; and
 procure district-level support.

Proponents state that such a program is able to create a positive atmosphere and culture in almost any school, but the support, resources, and consistency in using the program over time must be present.

See also
 Applied Behavior Analysis
 Behavior management
 Behavior Modification
 Behavioral engineering
 Child time-out
 Contingency management
 Positive education
 Professional practice of behavior analysis
 Reinforcement
 Systematic desensitization
Tootling

Alternatives to Special Education Approaches (Special Populations)
 Family support
 Group home
 Inclusion (education)
 Normalization
 Social role valorization
 Supported housing
 Supported living

References

External links
 Virtuoso Education Consulting LLC – Professional Development Training on PBS
 Association for Positive Behavior Support
 The US Dept. of Education Technical Assistance Center on Positive Behavior Support
 Florida's Positive Behavior Support Project
 The PBIS Compendium
 The Irish Association for Behavioural Support
 The Callan Institute '"Training & Consultancy Services in PBS, Dublin, Ireland "' 
Training and consultancy services, 
 The Behavior Analyst Online
 Utah's Academic, Behavior, and Coaching Initiative
 Learning Together Ltd. Positive Behaviour Support
 Social Role Valorization consulting group

Behavior modification
Industrial and organizational psychology
Life coaching
Personal development
Behaviorism